Bruno Antonio Baranda Ferrán (Born 12 October 1963) is a Chilean lawyer and politician. He was member of Renovación Nacional and Social Development Minister under President Sebastián Piñera's first government. Besides, during the same administration he was Undersecretary of Labor.

Since December 2018 until December 2019, he was Televisión Nacional de Chile's Board President.

References

1963 births
Living people
Government ministers of Chile
Diego Portales University alumni